Zora is a genus of spiders in the family Miturgidae, consisting of small to medium entelegyne, ecribellate spiders. They can be identified as they have two claws with claw tufts, distinct longitudinal bands on the cephalothorax, 4-2-2 arrangement of the eight eyes and long overlapping spines on the first two tibiae and metatarsi. Their abdomens show distinct colour patterns which may be useful in identification to species. There are 17 species in the genus which have a Holarctic distribution, mostly in Europe and the Middle East but with two species in North America.
The type species is Zora spinimana.

Identification
Zora spiders have a narrow anterior carapace with a characteristic dark compact eye group with both of the rows of eyes strongly recurved. There are paired ventral spines on legs I and II. All of the species are similar in general appearance, their general colour is yellow with a wide brown band extending back from each posterior lateral eye. The prosoma has a thin Y-shaped brown marking with spots and irregular lines along its flanks.

Species
The following species are listed as accepted in the World Spider Catalog .

Zora acuminate Zhu & Zhang, 2006 - China
Zora alpina Kulczyński, 1915 - Switzerland, Italy 
Zora armillata Simon, 1878 -  Europe, Russia 
Zora distincta Kulczyński, 1915 - Eastern Europe
Zora hespera  Corey & Mott, 1991 - United States of America, Canada
Zora lyriformis  Song, Zhu & Gao, 1993 - China 
Zora manicata  Simon, 1878 - Europe, Ukraine, Israel
Zora nemoralis  (Blackwall, 1861) - Palearctic 
Zora opiniosa  (O. Pickard-Cambridge, 1872) - Lebanon 
Zora palmgreni  Holm, 1945 - Sweden 
Zora parallela  Simon, 1878 - Europe, Russia 
Zora pardalis  Simon, 1878 - Europe to Kazakhstan 
Zora prespaensis  Drensky, 1929 - Macedonia 
Zora pumila  (Hentz, 1850) - United States of America 
Zora silvestris  Kulczyński, 1897 - Europe to Central Asia 
Zora spinimana  (Sundevall, 1833) - Palearctic

References

Miturgidae
Araneomorphae genera
Spiders of Asia
Spiders of North America